Sindon may refer to:
 Sindon (cloth), a type of fine muslin fabric; by extension also an item of this fabric:
 burial shroud, especially the one used for the burial of Jesus (see Shroud of Turin)
 corporals, cloths used in Christian liturgy
 wads or rolls of such cloth formerly used in filling open wounds during surgery
 , a village in Cetinje Municipality, Montenegro
 Sindon (horse), a horse who won the Irish Derby in the 1950s
 Sindon, Myanmar, a place in Shwebo Township

See also 
 Sinden (disambiguation)